Phlegmacium flavivelatum is a species of fungus in the family Cortinariaceae.

Taxonomy 
It was originally described in 2014 by the mycologists Ilkka Kytövuori, Kare Liimatainen and Tuula Niskanen who classified it as Cortinarius flavivelatus. It was placed in the (subgenus Phlegmacium) of the large mushroom genus Cortinarius.

In 2022 the species was transferred from Cortinarius and reclassified as Phlegmacium flavivelatum based on genomic data.

Etymology 
The specific epithet flavivelatum (originally flavivelatus) refers to the yellow colour of the universal veil.

Habitat and distribution 
Known only from boreal coniferous forests of Sweden.

Similar species 
The species is closely related to Phlegmacium pini, which differs by having a white universal veil and larger spores.

See also
List of Cortinarius species

References

External links

flavivelatus
Fungi described in 2014
Fungi of Sweden